Shadows in the Sun is a television movie starring Harvey Keitel and Joshua Jackson. It premiered on ABC Family in 2005.  It was written and directed by Brad Mirman, and was filmed under the title The Shadow Dancer.

Synopsis
Jeremy (Joshua Jackson), an American-British book editor, is an aspiring writer seeking a new lease on life. He is sent by his employer to Tuscany, Italy to elicit a new book from American-Italian author Weldon Parrish (Harvey Keitel). Jeremy is totally captivated by Weldon's daughter Isabella (Claire Forlani).

Only later, after many difficulties, Jeremy gains access to the true nature of Weldon who becomes his mentor. They spend time walking around the countryside while exchanging life experiences and thoughts. Together they socialize with the local people on various occasions and Jeremy befriends a few of them. One festive night, he shares an intimate moment with Isabella.

At the end, mutual honesty of the two men leads to successful outcomes for both. Weldon finds an inspiration and once again is able to write. Jeremy was going to return but opts instead for a major change of his life based on his love interest.

Cast
 Harvey Keitel as Weldon Parish    
 Joshua Jackson as Jeremy Taylor
 Claire Forlani as Isabella Parish
 Giancarlo Giannini as Father Moretti
Armando Pucci as Gustavo
 Valeria Cavalli as Amalia
 Bianca Guaccero as Maura Parish
Silvia De Santis as Dinnie Parish
 John Rhys-Davies as Mr. Benton

External links
 
 
 Shadows in the Sun (Josh Jackson network)

2005 television films
2005 films
ABC Family original films
Films about writers
Films set in Tuscany
Films directed by Brad Mirman
Films with screenplays by Brad Mirman